Windsor Forest Colleges Group is a group of further education colleges located in Berkshire, England. It was formerly known as East Berkshire College. It consists of Strode's College, Windsor College, Langley College, and the Berkshire College of Agriculture (BCA).

History

In 2007-08, the college had 11,078 students enrolled, most part-time. In September 2016, a merger with Strode's College was announced, which was due to be completed in February 2017.

Ofsted ratings 
Full Ofsted inspections:

 May 2009 - Rated "good" 
 February 2013 - Rated "good" 
 November 2016 - Rated "requires improvement" 
 November 2019 - Rated "good" rts]

References

External links
College website

Further education colleges in Berkshire
Education in Slough
Education in the Royal Borough of Windsor and Maidenhead